or  is a village area in the Tverrelvdalen valley in Alta Municipality in Troms og Finnmark county, Norway. It is a suburb to the southeast of the town of Alta. The river Tverrelva runs through the valley and village area. The Tverrelvdalen IL sports club is based here.

References

Villages in Finnmark
Alta, Norway
Populated places of Arctic Norway